Marley & Me is a 2008 American comedy-drama film directed by David Frankel from a screenplay by Scott Frank and Don Roos, based on the 2005 memoir of the same name by John Grogan. The film stars Owen Wilson and Jennifer Aniston as the owners of Marley, a Labrador retriever. Marley & Me was released in the United States and Canada on December 25, 2008, and set a record for the largest Christmas Day box office ever with $14.75 million in ticket sales. The film was followed by a 2011 direct-to-video prequel, Marley & Me: The Puppy Years.

Plot
Newlyweds John and Jenny Grogan  escape the brutal Michigan winters and relocate to South Florida, each landing reporter jobs at competing newspapers. At The Palm Beach Post, Jenny immediately receives prominent front-page assignments, while at the South Florida Sun-Sentinel, John finds himself writing obituaries and mundane two-paragraph news articles.

When John senses Jenny is contemplating motherhood, his friend and co-worker, Sebastian Tunney, suggests adopting a dog to test their readiness to raise a family. They choose a yellow Labrador retriever puppy that John names Marley (after Bob Marley). After a year, he grows into a big dog and soon proves to be incorrigible, forcing John and Jenny to enroll him in a dog obedience program run by a woman named Ms. Kornblut. Unfortunately, Marley refuses to obey commands and when she blows her whistle, he tackles her and humps her leg, prompting her to kick him out of her class. When they tried to take Marley to get neutered, he tried to escape the car onto a busy road, almost getting him roadkilled.

Editor Arnie Klein offers John a twice-weekly column writing anything he likes. Initially stumped for ideas, John realizes that Marley's misadventures might be the perfect topic for his first column. Arnie loves it, and Marley's continual wreaking havoc on the household provides John a wealth of material. The column proves popular with readers and eventually helps double the paper's circulation. Meanwhile, Jenny miscarries early in her first trimester, leaving them devastated.

Jenny and John have a belated honeymoon in Ireland, leaving Marley at home, under a young woman's care. She cannot control him well, and John and Jenny return to a damaged house. Soon after, Jenny discovers she's pregnant and nine months later, she delivers a healthy boy, Patrick. When a second son, Conor, arrives, Jenny opts to be a stay-at-home mom, so John takes on a daily column for a doubled salary. With their family growing and concern over the neighborhood's crime rate, they move to a larger house in Boca Raton, where Marley delights in swimming in the backyard pool.

Jenny exhibits postpartum depression symptoms, stressed with raising two small children, and becoming increasingly impatient and irritable with Marley and also John. Sebastian agrees to take Marley for a few days after Jenny, upset and angry, demands John find him a new home. Jenny quickly realizes Marley is an indispensable part of the family. A few years and nine months later, they have a daughter, Colleen.

After turning 40, and envious when Sebastian is hired by The New York Times, John grows dissatisfied with being a columnist. With Jenny's blessing, he accepts a reporter job with The Philadelphia Inquirer, and the family moves to a farm in rural Pennsylvania. John soon realizes he is a better columnist than reporter and pitches a column idea to his editor. Life is idyllic until the aging Marley suffers a near-fatal intestinal disorder. He recovers, but, too old for corrective surgery, suffers a second attack later. Marley is euthanized with John at his side. The family pay their last respects to their beloved pet as they bury him beneath a tree in their front yard.

Cast
 Owen Wilson as John Grogan
 Jennifer Aniston as Jennifer "Jenny" Grogan
 Eric Dane as Sebastian Tunney
 Alan Arkin as Arnie Klein
 Haley Hudson as Debbie
 Haley Bennett as Lisa
 Kathleen Turner as Ms. Kornblut
 Ann Dowd as Dr. Platt
 Nathan Gamble as Patrick Grogan (Age 10)
Bryce Robinson as Patrick Grogan (Age 7)
Dylan Henry as Patrick Grogan (Age 3)
Finley Jacobsen as Conor Grogan (Age 8)
Ben Hyland as Conor Grogan (Age 5)
Lucy Merriam as Colleen Grogan (Age 5)

Production
Because the film covers 14 years in the life of the dog, 22 different yellow labradors played the part of Marley (as revealed in the special feature Finding Marley on the DVD).

The film was shot on location in Florida's West Palm Beach, Fort Lauderdale, Hollywood, Miami, and Dolphin Stadium, in addition to Philadelphia and West Chester in Pennsylvania. The Irish honeymoon scenes were shot in and around Ballynahinch Castle, Connemara, County Galway, Ireland.

The film's score was composed by Theodore Shapiro, who previously had worked with director Frankel on The Devil Wears Prada. He recorded it with the Hollywood Studio Symphony at the Newman Scoring Stage at 20th Century Fox.

Dave Barry, Grogan's fellow South Florida humor columnist, makes an uncredited cameo as a guest at the surprise party celebrating Grogan's 40th birthday.

Release

Critical reception
Marley & Me received mixed to positive reviews from critics. On Rotten Tomatoes the film holds a rating of 63% based on 142 reviews, with an average rating of 6.10/10. The site's critical consensus reads, "Pet owners should love it, but Marley and Me is only sporadically successful in wringing drama and laughs from its scenario." On Metacritic, the film has a score of 53 out of 100, based on 30 critics, indicating "mixed or average reviews". Audiences polled by CinemaScore gave the film an average grade of "A" on an A+ to F scale.

Todd McCarthy of Variety said the film is "as broad and obvious as it could be, but delivers on its own terms thanks to sparky chemistry between its sunny blond stars, Owen Wilson and Jennifer Aniston, and the unabashed emotion-milking of the final reel. Fox has a winner here, likely to be irresistible to almost everyone but cats ... Animated and emotionally accessible, Aniston comes off better here than in most of her feature films, and Wilson spars well with her, even if, in the film's weaker moments, he shows he's on less certain ground with earnest material than he is with straight-faced impertinence."

Kirk Honeycutt of The Hollywood Reporter observed that "seldom does a studio release feature so little drama—and not much comedy either, other than when the dog clowns around ... [W]hatever Marley wants to be about—the challenges of marriage or the balancing act between career and family—gets subsumed by pet tricks. Dog lovers won't care, and that basically is the audience for the film. From Fox's standpoint, it may be enough ... Marley & Me is a warm and fuzzy family movie, but you do wish that at least once someone would upstage the dog."

Roger Ebert of the Chicago Sun-Times called the film "a cheerful family movie" and added, "Wilson and Aniston demonstrate why they are gifted comic actors. They have a relationship that's not too sitcomish, not too sentimental, mostly smart and realistic", whilst Owen Gleiberman  of Entertainment Weekly graded the film A−, calling it "the single most endearing and authentic movie about the human–canine connection in decades. As directed by David Frankel, though, it's also something more: a disarmingly enjoyable, wholehearted comic vision of the happy messiness of family life."

Steve Persall of the St. Petersburg Times was also very positive, graded the film B and commenting, "Marley & Me practically leaps at viewers like a pound puppy seeking affection, and darn if it doesn't deserve some ... Things could get mushier or sillier, but Frankel and screenwriters Scott Frank and Don Roos—who usually handle grittier material—decline to play the easy, crowd-pleasing game. Their faith in Grogan's simple tale of loyalty among people and pets is unique, and it pays off ... [It] isn't extraordinary cinema, but it relates to everyday people in the audience in a way that few movies do without being dull."

Walter Addiego of the San Francisco Chronicle said, "this love letter to man's best friend will make dog fanciers roll over and do tricks. It's so warmhearted, you'll want to run out and hug the nearest big, sloppy mutt." The praise continued with Carrie Rickey of The Philadelphia Inquirer awarding the film three out of four stars and saying, "Marley and Me operates on the assumption that happiness is a warm tongue bath. And those who endorse this belief will enjoy this shaggy dog story ... The anecdotal structure does not make for a gripping movie. For one thing, there's no conflict, unless you count the tension between a guy and his untrainable pooch. Yet Marley boasts animal magnetism ... Mawkish? Sometimes. But often very funny and occasionally very moving."

The film also had bad reviews though, with Betsy Sharkey of the Los Angeles Times calling it "an imperfect, messy and sometimes trying film that has moments of genuine sweetness and humor sprinkled in between the saccharine and the sadness."

Peter Bradshaw of The Guardian was unimpressed, awarding the film one out of five stars and commenting, "the relentless gooey yuckiness and fatuous stereotyping in this weepy feelbad comedy gave me the film critic's equivalent of a boiling hot nose," while Philip French of The Observer said, "the one redeeming feature is the presence as Wilson's editor of that great deadpan, put-on artist Alan Arkin, a comedian who can do a double-take without moving his head." Further criticism came from Colm Andrew of the Manx Independent who said that "Marley himself is surprisingly one-dimensional" and the ending was overemotional, going "for the heart-wrenching kind which will always provoke a response, but does so with absolutely no grace".

On Metro, Marley & Me was placed #5 in a poll of "20 movies that make men cry".

Box office
The film opened on 3,480 screens in the US and Canada on December 25, 2008. It grossed $14.75 million on its first day of release, setting the record for the best Christmas Day box office take ever by surpassing the previous high of $10.2 million achieved by Ali in 2001 (the record was broken the following year by Sherlock Holmes). It earned a total of $51.7 million over the four-day weekend and placed #1 at the box office, a position it maintained for two weeks. The film ended its run having grossed $143.2 million in the US and $104.7 million in foreign markets for a total worldwide box office of $247.8 million.

Accolades

Home media

20th Century Fox Home Entertainment released the film on DVD and Blu-ray Disc on March 31, 2009. Viewers have the option of a single disc or a two-disc set called the Bad Dog Edition. The film is in anamorphic widescreen format with audio tracks in English, French, and Spanish and subtitles in English and Spanish. Bonus features on the two-disc set include Finding Marley, Breaking the Golden Rule, On Set with Marley: Dog of All Trades, Animal Adoption, When Not to Pee, How Many Takes, a gag reel, and the Purina Dog Chow Video Hall of Fame and Marley & Me video contest finalists. The DVD has sold a total of 3,514,154 copies generating $61.41 million in sales revenue.

A prequel to the film, Marley & Me: The Puppy Years, was released direct-to-video on June 1, 2011.

Soundtrack

Additional music of Marley & Me

References

External links

 
 
 
 
 
 

2000s children's comedy films
2000s children's drama films
2008 comedy-drama films
2008 films
20th Century Fox films
American children's comedy films
American children's drama films
American comedy-drama films
Children's comedy-drama films
Dune Entertainment films
2000s English-language films
Fictional married couples
Films about dogs
Films about writers
Films directed by David Frankel
Films based on non-fiction books
Films produced by Karen Rosenfelt
Films scored by Theodore Shapiro
Films about pets
Films set in the 1980s
Films set in the 1990s
Films set in the 2000s
Films set in Miami
Films set in Pennsylvania
Films shot in Miami
Films shot in Pennsylvania
Films with screenplays by Don Roos
Films with screenplays by Scott Frank
Regency Enterprises films
2000s American films